Maria Clara Eimmart (27 May 1676 – 29 October 1707), was a German astronomer, engraver and designer. She was the daughter and assistant of Georg Christoph Eimmart the Younger.

Biography
Maria Clara Eimmart was a German astronomer born in Nuremberg. She was the daughter of painter, engraver, and amateur astronomer Georg Christoph Eimmart the Younger, who was also director of the Nuremberg Academy of Art, the Malerakademie, from 1699 to 1704. Her grandfather, Georg Christoph Eimmart the Elder, was also an engraver and painter of portraits, still-lifes, landscapes, and historical subjects.

The profession of Maria Clara Eimmart’s father was lucrative, but he spent all of his earnings in the purchase of astronomical instruments and on building (in 1678) a private observatory on the Nuremberg city wall. He was a diligent observer and published his results in various memoirs and scientific transactions.

Because of the strength of the crafts tradition in Germany, Maria Clara Eimmart was able to take advantage of the opportunity to train as an apprentice to her father. Through him, she received a broad education in French, Latin, mathematics, astronomy, drawing, and engraving. Her skills as an engraver allowed her to assist her father in his work, and she became known for her depictions of the phases of the moon. In addition, she illustrated flowers, birds, and classical subjects, but most of these paintings have been lost. 
In 1706, Eimmart married Johann Heinrich Muller (1671-1731), her father’s pupil and successor, who had become director of the Eimmart observatory in 1705. Muller also taught physics at the Nuremberg Gymnasium, where Eimmart assisted her husband. Muller was so influenced by the family love for astronomy that he became a diligent amateur and afterwards a professor at Altorf, where he used his skill in depicting comets, sun-spots, and lunar mountains aided by Maria Clara. In the early years of their marriage, their associates included the two Rost Brothers, who were novelists and astronomers, and Doppelmayer, a historian of astronomy. In 2012 Markus Heinz of the Staatsbibliothek zu Berlin discovered two paintings by her of a total solar eclipse that was seen in Nuremberg in 1706. These were known to have existed but were also thought lost.  These paintings are in excellent agreement with text descriptions of the event and are now of considerable scientific importance, being a unique depiction by a trained astronomer of the solar corona during the Maunder minimum.

Just a year after her marriage, Maria Clara Eimmart died in childbirth in Nuremberg.

Astronomical illustrations

Eimmart is best known for her exact astronomical illustrations done in pale pastels on dark blue cardboard. Between 1693 and 1698, Eimmart made over 350 drawings of the phases of the moon. This collection of drawings, drawn solely from observations through a telescope, was entitled Micrographia stellarum phases lunae ultra 300. Twelve of these were given to Luigi Ferdinando Marsili, a scientific collaborator of her father's, and ten survive in Bologna, together with three smaller studies on brown paper. Eimmart’s continuous series of depictions became the basis for a new lunar map. In 1706, Eimmart made two illustrations of the total eclipse at Nuremberg. There are also some drawings of planets and comets.

Schiebinger states that some sources claim Eimmart published a work under her father’s name in 1701, the Ichnographia nova contemplationum de sole. However, there is no evidence to support that this was her work and not her father’s.

Gallery

See also
Timeline of women in science

Notes

Literature
 Hans Gaab: Zum 300. Todestag von Maria Clara Eimmart (1676–1707). In: Regiomontanusbote. 20, 4/2007, S. 7–19.
 Hans Gaab: Maria Clara Eimmart. Eine Nürnberger Astronomin. In: Nadja Bennewitz, Gaby Franger: Geschichte der Frauen in Mittelfranken. Alltag, Personen und Orte. Ars vivendi, Cadolzburg 2003, S. 145–152.
 Ronald Stoyan: Die Nürnberger Mondkarten. Teil 1: Die Mondkarte von Georg Christoph Eimmart (1638–1705) und Maria Clara Eimmart (1676–1707). In: Regiomontanusbote. 14, 1/2001, S. 29–39.
 
 
Adolf Wißner (1959), "Georg Christoph Eimmart", Neue Deutsche Biographie (NDB) (in German) (Berlin: Duncker & Humblot) 4: 394–394, (full text online)

External links
Astronomical Illustrations by Maria Clara Eimmart
Maria Clara Eimmart at Astronomie in Nürnberg
Georg Christoph Eimmart at Astronomie in Nürnberg
Drawing of a Vestalin by Maria Clara Eimmart Germanischen Nationalmuseum Nürnberg

1676 births
1707 deaths
17th-century German astronomers
German engravers
Scientists from Nuremberg
Women astronomers
17th-century women scientists
18th-century women scientists
18th-century German astronomers
Deaths in childbirth